Travis Baker is an Australian former professional rugby league footballer who played in the 1990s. He played for Western Suburbs in the NRL competition.

Playing career
Baker made his first grade debut for Western Suburbs in round 14 of the 1998 NRL season against the Auckland Warriors. Baker started at centre in Wests 18-16 victory. Baker made a total of 11 appearances as the club finished with the Wooden Spoon. In 1999, Baker made eight appearances including the clubs final ever game as a stand-alone entity which came against the Auckland Warriors in round 26. Baker played from the bench as Wests lost 60-16. Western Suburbs also finished the year with the wooden spoon and conceded the most points by any team in NSWRL/NRL history with 944. At the end of the year, Western Suburbs merged with fellow foundation club Balmain to form the Wests Tigers. Baker was not offered a contract to play for the new team and never played first grade again.

References

1975 births
Western Suburbs Magpies players
Australian rugby league players
Rugby league centres
Living people